Bear Mountain is an unincorporated community in Barbour County, West Virginia, United States.

References

Unincorporated communities in Barbour County, West Virginia
Unincorporated communities in West Virginia